The Arkansas RimRockers were a minor league basketball team based in North Little Rock, Arkansas, which played in the American Basketball Association and the NBA Development League.

Season by season

Franchise history

The RimRockers began play during the 2004-05 season for the American Basketball Association. They posted a 32-5 record in the team’s inaugural season and won the ABA championship. Soon after winning the title, they left the ABA and began play in the NBA Development League for the 2005-06 season.

On February 10, 2006, the team fired head coach Joe Harge, the only man to coach the team up to that point. He was replaced by Andy Stoglin.

Stoglin said he would bring a much different style that begins with strict discipline. He joined the organization as an assistant during the 2005-06 season after leading the Mississippi Stingers to the ABA semifinals, where they lost to Arkansas. Stoglin has been coaching since 1969, including a 13-year run as Jackson State’s head coach.

The team did not return to Arkansas for 2007-08 because attendance dropped to the point that the owner could no longer afford the lease. The team hoped to move to La Crosse, Wisconsin, to play at the La Crosse Center for the 2007-08 season, where they would have been known as the La Crosse RimRockers. However, due to the Center's lease demands being higher than Little Rock's, the deal fell through. The team was inactive for the 2007-08 season, and again in the 2008-09 season.

Players of note
  Pape Sow
 Jamario Moon
 Todd Day
 Roger Powell, Jr.
 Kareem Reid
 Clay Tucker
 Scotty Thurman
 Derek Clifton
 Pat Bradley
 Oliver Miller

Final roster

NBA affiliates
Atlanta Hawks (2005–2007)
Cleveland Cavaliers (2005–2006)
Memphis Grizzlies (2005–2007)
Miami Heat (2006–2007)
Toronto Raptors (2005–2006)

References

External links
Arkansas RimRockers 2006-2007 Schedule
Arkansas RimRockers Homepage
Official NBA Development League website

 
Defunct American Basketball Association (2000–present) teams
Basketball teams established in 2004
Basketball teams disestablished in 2007
2004 establishments in Arkansas
Basketball teams in Arkansas
2007 disestablishments in Arkansas